Kirkistown Castle is a castle situated near Cloghy, County Down, Northern Ireland. The tower house and bawn is a state care historic monument in the townland of Kirkistown, in Ards and North Down Borough (at grid ref: J6450 5800).

It is an impressive three-storey tower house, built in 1622 by Roland Savage, a Norman landlord, at the site of a ninth-century round tower. It was occupied until 1731, when it was deserted. It post-dates the Plantation, but is fully in the late medieval tower-house tradition. Parts of the bawn wall survive with three-quarter round flanker towers at the angles. The tower was remodelled in Gothic style in 1800 by a Col. Johnston, and in 1836 some further work was performed by a very young Master Montgomery of Grey Abbey. The building was left, however, with a partial roof and broken windows, and the elements soon returned it to disrepair. The Northern Ireland Environment Agency opened it to the public for the first time in 2001.

See also 
Castles in Northern Ireland

References

Castles in County Down
Savage family